Blelloch is a surname. Notable people with the surname include:

Guy Blelloch, American professor of computer science
Ian Blelloch (1901–1982), British colonial administrator in Malaya
Sir John Blelloch (1930–2017), British civil servant

See also
Blaylock